The General Electric Building is a building at 51st St. and Lexington Avenue, in New York City.

General Electric Building may also refer to:
30 Rockefeller Plaza, formerly the GE Building, also in New York City

See also
Electric Tower, sometimes General Electric Tower, Buffalo, New York
General Electric Research Laboratory, Schenectady, New York
General Electric Switchgear Plant, Philadelphia, Pennsylvania